Iván Ramiro Córdoba Sepúlveda (born 11 August 1976) is a retired Colombian footballer, who played as a defender. He began his career in Colombia with Deportivo Rionegro and Atlético Nacional, before moving to Argentine club San Lorenzo. In 2000, he joined Italian side Internazionale, where he spent most of his career, remaining with the club until his retirement in 2012. At international level, Córdoba played for the Colombia national team, and represented his nation at the 1998 FIFA World Cup, the 2003 FIFA Confederations Cup, and four editions of the Copa América, winning the tournament in 2001, where he scored the winning goal in the final. He was the vice-captain of Internazionale and has also served as captain for his country's national team.

He is currently in charge as sporting director of Italian Serie B club Venezia.

Club career
Córdoba made his debut with the Colombian Serie B team Deportivo Rionegro in 1993, his wonderful performances earned him a transfer to Colombian heavyweights Atlético Nacional in 1996. He made his name playing for San Lorenzo in Argentina from 1998 but signed for Italian side Inter Milan the winter transfer window, January 2000, costing the club €16 million, rejecting another offer from Real Madrid in doing so. He has become a mainstay of the Internazionale defence for several years, forming a highly effective partnership in central defence with Marco Materazzi. His long career at Inter led him to be named the club's vice-captain behind Javier Zanetti; because of this, he had the honour of lifting the Coppa Italia in 2005 when Zanetti was absent due to his involvement in the Confederations Cup with Argentina.

On 19 February 2008, Córdoba injured his left anterior cruciate ligament during the Champions League round of 16 fixture against Liverpool, resulting in having to sit out the rest of the season as Inter won the league title for the third consecutive year. On 9 June 2008 he renewed his contract until 30 June 2012 with Inter, ensuring that he would effectively finish his career with Inter.

On 5 May 2012 Córdoba announced that he would leave Inter at the end of the season. A day later, Córdoba was brought on in the 84th minute of the Derby della Madonnina, making his last competitive appearance in an Inter shirt after 13 years in the San Siro; during the match (the club's last home game of the 2011–12 season), Inter's players wore the Córdoba #2 shirt while warming up before the kick-off. In May, he traveled with 18 other Inter players (with Dellafiore an exception) to Indonesia for a friendly tour, before ending his career.

In total, he won 5 Serie A championships, 4 Coppa Italia titles, 3 Supercoppa Italiana titles, 1 UEFA Champions League, and 1 FIFA Club World Cup with Inter.

International career
Córdoba captained Colombia to win the 2001 Copa América competition, scoring the only goal in the final. Córdoba also was called up for his country at the 1998 World Cup (taking shirt number 2 from Andrés Escobar who was murdered in the previous tournament) without appearing in a match, the 2003 FIFA Confederations Cup (where they finished in fourth place), and in three other editions of the Copa América (1997, 1999, and 2007).

Post-playing career
On 10 February 2021, Córdoba was announced as the new sporting director of Italian Serie B club Venezia.

Style of play
Usually a central defender, Córdoba was an experienced and extremely fast, energetic, versatile, and athletic defender, who relied mostly on his pace, stamina, man-marking ability and timing, which made him difficult to beat in one on one situations; due to his characteristics, he was also capable of playing as a full back or wing-back on the right flank, and even as a left-back on occasion. Despite being only 173 centimeters tall, he was also a good jumper and an accurate header of the ball, and had a penchant for scoring goals with his head. Throughout his career, Córdoba also stood out for his leadership in addition to his ability as a footballer.

Career statistics

Club
Source:

International
Source:

International goals
Colombia score listed first, score column indicates score after each Córdoba goal.

Honours

Club
Internazionale
Serie A: 2005–06, 2006–07, 2007–08, 2008–09, 2009–10
Coppa Italia: 2004–05, 2005–06, 2009–10, 2010–11
Supercoppa Italiana: 2005, 2006, 2008, 2010
UEFA Champions League: 2009–10
FIFA Club World Cup: 2010

International
Colombia
Copa América: 2001

Individual
South American Team of the Year: 1999
Pirata d'Oro (Internazionale Player of the Year): 2011

References

External links

inter.it profile  

1976 births
Living people
People from Rionegro
Colombian footballers
Association football central defenders
Leones F.C. footballers
Atlético Nacional footballers
San Lorenzo de Almagro footballers
Inter Milan players
Categoría Primera B players
Categoría Primera A players
Argentine Primera División players
Serie A players
UEFA Champions League winning players
Colombia international footballers
1997 Copa América players
1998 FIFA World Cup players
1999 Copa América players
2001 Copa América players
2003 FIFA Confederations Cup players
2007 Copa América players
Copa América-winning players
Colombian expatriate footballers
Colombian expatriate sportspeople in Argentina
Colombian expatriate sportspeople in Italy
Expatriate footballers in Argentina
Expatriate footballers in Italy
Sportspeople from Antioquia Department